Sai Kung is a non-administrative area of Hong Kong that does not have a legally defined boundary. Administratively, it is divided by Sai Kung District and Tai Po District.

Sai Kung may refer to:
 Sai Kung Town, or just Sai Kung, a town and administrative area in the Sai Kung District, Hong Kong
 Sai Kung Peninsula, a peninsula in Hong Kong
 Sai Kung District, an administrative district in Hong Kong, which does not cover the northern half of Sai Kung Peninsula

See also
Sai Kung District Council
 Sai Kung Commons, a political grouping
 Sai Kung Hoi, a bay near Sai Kung Town, Hong Kong
 Sai Kung East Country Park
 Sai Kung West Country Park
 Sai Kung West Country Park (Wan Tsai Extension)
 Tseung Kwan O New Town, another town centre of Sai Kung District